Whipper Watson may refer to:
 Whipper Billy Watson (1915–1990), Canadian professional wrestler
 Harry Watson (ice hockey b. 1923) (1923–2002),  Canadian National Hockey League hockey player
 Bob Watson (lacrosse) (b. 1970), goaltender for the Toronto Rock of the National Lacrosse League
Kenan Thompson, from Kenan and Kel